Thomas Barber (20 February 1888 – 18 September 1925) was an English professional footballer who played in the Football League for Aston Villa, Bolton Wanderers, Merthyr Town and Walsall as a half back or inside left. He scored the winning goal for Aston Villa in the 1913 FA Cup Final.

Personal life 
Barber attended Todd's Nook School. He served as a private in the Football Battalion of the Middlesex Regiment during the First World War and saw action at Delville Wood and Waterlot Farm in the summer of 1916, before suffering gunshot wounds to the legs at Guillemont. Barber was evacuated to Britain and after recovering in Aberdeen, he spent another period in hospital suffering from pleurisy. He was later transferred to the Labour Corps and also worked in a munitions factory in Glasgow. Barber died of tuberculosis in 1925.

Career statistics

Honours 
Bolton Wanderers
 Football League Second Division: 1908–09
 Football League Second Division second-place promotion: 1910–11
Aston Villa
 FA Cup: 1912–13

References

1888 births
1925 deaths
English footballers
Shankhouse F.C. players
West Stanley F.C. players
Bolton Wanderers F.C. players
Aston Villa F.C. players
Stalybridge Celtic F.C. players
Crystal Palace F.C. players
Merthyr Town F.C. players
Ton Pentre F.C. players
Pontypridd F.C. players
Walsall F.C. players
Darlaston Town F.C. players
Hinckley United F.C. players
Barwell United F.C. players
Belfast Celtic F.C. wartime guest players
Celtic F.C. wartime guest players
Partick Thistle F.C. wartime guest players
Linfield F.C. wartime guest players
Lisburn Distillery F.C. wartime guest players
English Football League players
Southern Football League players
British Army personnel of World War I
Middlesex Regiment soldiers
Royal Pioneer Corps soldiers
20th-century deaths from tuberculosis
Brentford F.C. wartime guest players
Association football wing halves
Association football inside forwards
Tuberculosis deaths in England
British shooting survivors
People from South Moor
Footballers from County Durham
FA Cup Final players